Comcast Corp. v. Behrend, 569 U.S. 27 (2013), is a United States Supreme Court case dealing with class certification under the Federal Rules of Civil Procedure. The case restricted class certifications. The votes were split upon typical ideological lines, but, in an unusual move, the dissent was jointly written by two justices.

References

External links
 

United States Supreme Court cases
United States Supreme Court cases of the Roberts Court
2013 in United States case law
Comcast
United States antitrust case law
United States class action case law